The State of Cao was a vassal state in China during the Zhou Dynasty (1046–221 BC). The state was founded sometime in the 11th century BC by Cao Shu Zhenduo (曹叔振鐸; d. 1053 BC), a son of King Wen of Zhou and younger brother of King Wu of Zhou. With its capital at Taoqiu (陶丘), the State of Cao covered roughly the area of modern-day Dingtao County, Shandong Province. It was located on the flat country of the North China Plain about 50 miles east of the point where the current course of the Yellow River changes from east to north-east. To the northwest was Wey, to the northeast Lu and to the southeast Song.

History
As a result of the Cao's relative weakness, later generations wrote few records on events concerning the state's history. The only major event recorded in the Records of the Grand Historian during the Western Zhou Dynasty (1046 – 770 BC) was in 826 BC when Count You of Cao was killed by his younger brother Count Dai of Cao.

At the beginning of the Eastern Zhou Dynasty (770 BC), the State of Cao suffered internal upheaval. In 760 BC, Duke Mu of Cao killed his elder brother Count Fei of Cao and appointed himself the eleventh ruler. He was the first ruler of the State of Cao to receive the title of "Duke" (公).

During the Spring and Autumn period the State of Cao became caught up in the struggle for hegemony between the states of Jin and Chu. In 637 BC Chong'er, son of Duke Xian of Jin got into difficulties when passing through the State of Cáo and was treated rudely by Duke Gong of Cao.

About 630 it was a vassal or ally of Chu. When Chu attacked Song, Jin made a diversionary attack on Cao. After Jin defeated Chu at the Battle of Chengpu in 632 BC, Jin crushed the State of Cao, rescued the State of Song and took Duke Gong of Cao prisoner. After the defeat of the State of Chu, Cao followed the orders of its near neighbour the State of Jin.

Later on, the States of Cao and Song became hostile towards each other. Duke Jing of Song captured Duke Dao of Cao in 515 BC and held him prisoner until his death. Thereafter, disorder broke out in Cao and Duke Dao's successors Duke Sheng of Cao and Duke Yin of Cao were killed one after another. Duke Fei of Cao became ruler and betrayed the State of Jin by invading the State of Song. As a result, Duke Jing of Song attacked Cao. No troops from the State of Jin came to the rescue such that the State of Cao was exterminated in 487 BC after the capture of Duke Fei of Cao.

Legacy
Descendants of the people of Cao adopted the name of their former state. This is one origin of the Chinese Surname Cao.

Rulers of Cao

Rulers family tree

See also
 Zou (state), founded by a Zhu lineage (later Zhulou and Zou) of the Cao clan.

References

External links
Chinese Text Project "Rulers of the States"

11th-century BC establishments in China
487 BC
5th-century BC disestablishments in China